Versailles High School is a public high school in Versailles, Ohio. It is the only high school in the Versailles Exempted Village School District. The Versailles Tigers are a member of the Midwest Athletic Conference. The current High School Principal is Jacki Stonebraker.

Athletics
The Versailles Tigers are a member of the competitive Midwest Athletic Conference (MAC). The Tigers have been a top contender in numerous varsity sports with state championships in football and volleyball most recently. Prior to joining the MAC, Versailles was a member of the Southwestern Rivers Conference from 1982-2001.

Ohio High School Athletic Association State Championships 

 Boys Football – 1967, 1990, 1993, 1994, 1995, 1998, 2003, 2021 
 Boys Baseball – 1965 
 Girls Cross Country – 2003, 2007 
 Girls Basketball - 2008, 2015 
 Girls Track and Field - 2010, 2012, 2013 
 Girls Volleyball - 2013, 2017 2018

New school 
In 2009, the Versailles community voted to build a new K-12 school building. Intended to house all grades, the school officially opened for the 2010-2011 school year.

References

External links
 District Website
 Tigerballonline
 Schedules

High schools in Darke County, Ohio
Public high schools in Ohio